Adam Hall (born 12 February 1996)  is a Scottish badminton player. He was the bronze medalist at the 2015 European Junior Championships in the boys' doubles event with his partner Alexander Dunn. He competed at the 2018 Commonwealth Games in Gold Coast.

Hall studied sport and fitness management at the Open University in Scotland.

Achievements

European Championships 
Men's doubles

European Junior Championships 
Boys' doubles

BWF Grand Prix (1 runner-up) 
The BWF Grand Prix had two levels, the Grand Prix and Grand Prix Gold. It was a series of badminton tournaments sanctioned by the Badminton World Federation (BWF) and played between 2007 and 2017.

Men's doubles

  BWF Grand Prix Gold tournament
  BWF Grand Prix tournament

BWF International Challenge/Series (6 titles, 4 runners-up)  
Men's doubles

Mixed doubles

  BWF International Challenge tournament
  BWF International Series tournament
  BWF Future Series tournament

References

External links 
 
 

1996 births
Living people
Sportspeople from Irvine, North Ayrshire
Scottish male badminton players
Badminton players at the 2018 Commonwealth Games
Badminton players at the 2022 Commonwealth Games
Commonwealth Games competitors for Scotland